Assédio (English: Harassment) is a Brazilian drama web television series produced by Rede Globo in association with O2 Filmes that premiered on the streaming service Globoplay on September 21, 2018. Based on the book “A Clínica – A Farsa e os Crimes de Roger Abdelmassih” by Vicente Vilardaga about the former Brazilian physician Roger Abdelmassih. The series is written by Maria Camargo and directed by Amora Mautner.

Premise
Dr. Roger Sadala is a famous and popular physician, specializing in artificial insemination. A professional above any suspicion, responsible for the birth of thousands of babies.

Dozens of women enter his clinic with the dream of becoming mothers, but during the procedure they are drugged and raped by the doctor. Later  it is also discovered that in addition to sexual crimes, the physician uses a somewhat unorthodox method in his reproductive processes. Discovering the various cases, numerous women unite by pain and decide to join forces to denounce the doctor and put him to prison.

Cast

Episodes

Awards and nominations

Paulista Association of Art Critics

References

External links
 

2010s Brazilian television series
2018 Brazilian television series debuts
Brazilian drama television series
Portuguese-language television shows
Globoplay original programming
Rape in television
Television series based on actual events